The Execution of All Things is the second full-length album released by Los Angeles-based indie pop band Rilo Kiley. Expanding on their previous musical sound that mostly incorporated guitars, vocals, percussion and pianos, the album contains heavy electronica sampling mixed into the songs in a rather unusual and displaced-sounding way. Also, unlike their previous tracks which were written in very traditional manners, the lyrics to the songs on Execution are very wordy and read like prose. Musically, the record has a very sunny disposition, with bouncing bass lines and simple melodies complemented by lead singer Jenny Lewis's vocal style, but the upbeat music is generally counterpointed by the often dark and morose subject matter that the lyrics reference. The album was released by Saddle Creek Records in Omaha, Nebraska, and the aforementioned features show the influence of that studio's associated Omaha Sound. It was recorded at Presto! in Lincoln, Nebraska.

The album is also strung together by a song that is broken into pieces and that trails between several tracks. Called "And That's How I Choose to Remember It", it tells the story of Lewis' childhood and her parents' divorce. This theme is visited throughout the album, which is lyrically filled with childhood recollections of loss, displacement, anger and hopelessness.

The songs "So Long" and "Three Hopeful Thoughts" feature lead vocals by Blake Sennett. Lewis sings lead on all other tracks.

The song "With Arms Outstretched" played in the final moments of the series finale of Weeds, just as it had in the pilot.

The song "A Better Son/Daughter" was played in the trailer for the first season of the Netflix original series Orange Is the New Black. It is also featured at the end of Hannah Gadsby's 2018 Netflix special Nanette.

Track listing
All songs written by Jenny Lewis and Blake Sennett, except where noted.

Personnel
Sourced from The Execution of All Things liner notes.

Rilo Kiley
Jenny Lewis – vocals , organ , guitar , keyboards , bass guitar , Rhodes electric piano , Ace Tone electric organ 
Blake Sennett – vocals , boy choir ; guitar , keyboards , sequencing , bass & multi-chord steel guitar 
Pierre de Reeder – bass guitar , guitar , keyboards 
Jason Boesel – boy choir ; drums , orchestra bells 

Additional musicians
Amy Huffman – violin on "The Execution of All Things" and "Capturing Moods"
Gretta Cohn – cello on "The Execution of All Things" and "Capturing Moods"
Jiha Lee – flute on "Hail to Whatever You Found in the Sunlight that Surrounds You"
Kristen Bailey – saw on "And That's How I Choose to Remember It"
Mike Mogis – pedal steel, guitar, vibraphone and glockenspiel on "The Good That Won't Come Out", pedal steel on "Paint's Peeling", pedal steel and vibraphone on "Hail to Whatever You Found in the Sunlight that Surrounds You", banjo on "And That's How I Choose to Remember It"
Rick Ricker – French horn on "Capturing Moods" and "My Slumbering Heart"
Ryan Fox – saxophone on "The Good That Won't Come Out"
Tim Kasher – accordion on "So Long"
Boy Choir on "With Arms Outstretched" – Blake Sennett, Jason Boesel, Conor Oberst and A.J. Mogis

Reception
Critics received the album positively upon release. Pitchfork praised the album's music and lyrics  saying "the words here are descriptive and articulate, but gracefully rendered"  writing that the album surpassed all Rilo Kiley's prior work.

Anne Hathaway called the track "A Better Son/Daughter" "a life-changing song" for helping to improve her mental health during a difficult period of her life in 2009.

Critics again celebrated the album at its 20th anniversary in 2022. Stereogum called Better Son/Daughter a "towering, monumental achievement" and praised the interconnected nature of all the tracks on the album. Paste Magazine noted  "the album's continued reverberation in a new generation of contemporary artists and listeners" and praised its treatment of mental illness, trauma, and gender.

References

External links
Rilo Kiley official website
 

2002 albums
Rilo Kiley albums
Saddle Creek Records albums
Albums produced by Mike Mogis